Dennis Emd Desjardin (born May 18, 1950, in Crescent City, California) is an American mycologist. He has been called the "Mushroom Guru of the West Coast".

Biography
Desjardin attended San Jose State University but dropped out to play jazz professionally. A decade later he sought a more stable career. At San Francisco State University (SFSU), he graduated in 1983 with a B.S. in botany and in 1985 with an M.A. in ecology and systematic biology. His M.A. thesis, The marasmioid fungi of California, was supervised by Harry D. Thiers. At the University of Tennessee in Knoxville, Desjardin graduated in 1989 with a Ph.D. in mycology. His Ph.D. thesis, The genus Marasmius from the southern Appalachian Mountains, was supervised by Ronald H. Petersen.

After completing his Ph.D., Desjardin was from 1989 to 1990 an assistant professor at Oberlin College. At San Francisco State University, he was an assistant professor from 1990 to 1993, an associate professor from 1993 to 1997, and a full professor from 1997 until his retirement as professor emeritus. In 1991 he was appointed the director of SFSU's Harry D. Thiers Herbarium. He retired from SFSU in 2021. He became the Chief Mycologist/Advisor for the corporation Sempera Organics.

Desjardin is the author or coauthor of more than 150 scientific publications. His research deals with the ecology and biogeography of fungal species associated with tropical and island habitats, bioluminescent fungi, and fungal systematics. He collaborated with teams of colleagues to elucidate the molecular phylogenetics of porcini mushrooms and species belonging to the agaric family. He is credited as the discoverer or co-discoverer of more than 300 fungal species, including species of luminescent mushrooms. Supported by eight National Science Foundation grants, he has participated in mycology fieldwork in the southeastern and western U.S.A. including the Rocky Mountains, Canada, Mexico, Colombia, Brazil, Switzerland, Java, Bali, Japan, Thailand, Malaysia, Singapore, China, Pohnpei, the Hawaiian Islands, the Philippines, São Tomé, and Príncipe.
 
He served as an associate editor for Fungal Diversity and Mycologia. He was elected in 1995 a Fellow of the California Academy of Science and in 2005 a Fellow of the Mycological Society of America.

Dennis Desjardin married Wipapat Kladwang, Ph.D. They have a son, Spenser L. Desjardin.

See also
 Spongiforma squarepantsii

Selected publications

Articles

Books

References

1950 births
Living people
American mycologists
San Francisco State University alumni
University of Tennessee alumni
San Francisco State University faculty